The 1988 Australian Manufacturers' Championship was an Australian motor sport title authorised by the Confederation of Australian Motor Sport (CAMS)  for Group 3A Touring Cars. It was the 18th circuit racing manufacturers championship to be awarded by CAMS and the ninth to be contested under the Australian Manufacturers' Championship name.

The championship was won jointly by Ford, BMW and Toyota.

Race calendar

The championship was contested over a nine-round series with rounds run concurrently with those of the 1988 Australian Touring Car Championship.

Classes
Cars competing in three displacement classes:
 Up to 2000cc
 2001 to 3000cc
 3001 to 6000cc

Points System
Points were awarded at each round to the top six placegetters in each class on a 9,6,4,3,2,1 basis  however only the best placed car of each make earned championship points. The best eight round results were retained by each manufacturer to determine final championship placings.

Championship standings

See also
 1988 Australian Touring Car season
 1988 Australian Touring Car Championship

References

Further reading
Australian Motor Racing Yearbook, 1988/89

External links
 Official V8 Supercar site Contains historical ATCC information.
 1988 Australian Touring Car race images at www.autopics.com.au

Australian Manufacturers' Championship
Manufacturers' Championship

sv:ATCC 1988